Walter Richard Szwender is a former provincial level politician and teacher from Alberta, Canada. He served as a member of the Legislative Assembly of Alberta from 1982 until 1986.

Political career
Szwender ran for a seat to the Alberta Legislature and was elected to the electoral district of Edmonton-Belmont in the 1982 Alberta general election. He held the seat for the governing Progressive Conservative caucus.

He ran for a second term in office in the 1986 Alberta general election but was defeated in a closely contested race by New Democrat candidate Tom Sigurdson. Szwender finished second out of six candidates.

Szwender would face off against Sigurdson three years later in the 1989 election in an attempt to retake Edmonton-Belmont and he was once again defeated, this time by a larger margin.

He would attempt another come back to the Alberta Legislature by running in the 2004 provincial election in Edmonton Decore as a last minute replacement after it was revealed that the nominated candidate Ray Hajar was a convicted criminal, and had years of unpaid alimony. Swzender ran against incumbent MLA Gary Masyk. Both Masyk and Swender were defeated by Liberal candidate Bill Bonko.

Szwender is a high school teacher.

References

External links
Legislative Assembly of Alberta Members Listing

1950 births
Living people
Politicians from Edmonton
Progressive Conservative Association of Alberta MLAs